Maryam Moshiri is a television broadcaster who currently works for the BBC.

Career
Moshiri began her career as a business reporter for Independent Radio News, before joining the BBC in 2003.

She worked for 16 years as a Business News Anchor on some of the BBC's flagship business programmes such as The Business Briefing, Work Life and Talking Business. Maryam also broadcast on Radio 4, BBC Breakfast news and presented the 8pm News bulletin on BBC1. She was also a regular presenter of the afternoon and evening business news on BBC News, the corporation's 24-hour news channel.

In 2019 Maryam became a Chief News Presenter at BBC World News and BBC News. She has anchored most of the global news channel's flagship programmes, including Outside Source, Impact and Global. Maryam has also presented The Papers on BBC News.  In February 2023, it was announced contiune as chief presenter on the BBC’s new news channel for both UK and international viewers due to launch in April.

Personal life
Moshiri graduated from University College London in 2000 with a BA in Italian. She then completed a Postgraduate Diploma in Broadcast Journalism at the London College of Communications, graduating in 2001.

Her sister, Nazanine Moshiri, worked as a foreign correspondent at Al Jazeera.

References

Living people
English reporters and correspondents
English television presenters
BBC newsreaders and journalists
BBC World News
Writers from London
Alumni of University College London
Year of birth missing (living people)